is a Japanese television drama series that first aired on TBS in 1984 and 1985.

Toru Ishibashi becomes a fifth grade homeroom teacher of Class 5-3 at Kichijoji Honcho elementary school. But unfortunately for him, the students of his classroom always cause trouble and mayhems.

Cast
 Masakazu Tamura as Toru Ishibashi
 Aiko Morishita as Ryoko Ishibashi
 George Tokoro as Chutaro Kosaka
 Reiko Nakamura as Nakano
 Nobuko Miyamoto as Ikeda
 Akio Hayashi as Goro Masuda
 Kin Sugai as Aramaki

References

External links
 

1984 Japanese television series debuts
1985 Japanese television series endings
Japanese drama television series
TBS Television (Japan) dramas
Television shows written by Kazuhiko Ban
Japanese comedy television series